is a former Japanese badminton player who plays in singles and doubles event. She was born in Ōbu, Aichi, and graduated from the Okazaki Josei High School. Uchida competed at the 2007 and 2008 Asian Junior Badminton Championships, winning a mixed team bronze medal in 2007. She was join the Unisys badminton team in April 2008. Her best achievement is to reach the final round of the Superseries event at the 2013 Japan Open. She retired in February 2016, after the Japan league final match.

Achievements

BWF Superseries 
The BWF Superseries, launched on 14 December 2006 and implemented in 2007, is a series of elite badminton tournaments, sanctioned by Badminton World Federation (BWF). BWF Superseries has two level such as Superseries and Superseries Premier. A season of Superseries features twelve tournaments around the world, which introduced since 2011, with successful players invited to the Superseries Finals held at the year end.

Women's singles

  BWF Superseries Finals tournament
  BWF Superseries Premier tournament
  BWF Superseries tournament

BWF Grand Prix 
The BWF Grand Prix has two levels: Grand Prix Gold and Grand Prix. It is a series of badminton tournaments, sanctioned by Badminton World Federation (BWF) since 2007.

Women's singles

  BWF Grand Prix Gold tournament
  BWF Grand Prix tournament

BWF International Challenge/Series 
Women's singles

  BWF International Challenge tournament
  BWF International Series tournament

References

External links 
 

Japanese female badminton players
Living people
1989 births
People from Ōbu, Aichi
Sportspeople from Aichi Prefecture